Emy Kat is a researcher, visual artist and photographer working in contemporary art and fine art photography.

Career and life
Emy Kat was born in 1959, of Middle Eastern descent.

He is a contemporary photographer whose large body of work has been built over several decades. Developing a love for the medium at an early age, he started photography when his father gave him his first camera at age 12. He went on to refine his craft in the United States and received a graduate degree in 1997 from the Brooks Institute of photography in Santa Barbara, California, (USA) with exceptional academic achievements and honors along with awards in Advertising and Creative Excellence.

Kat began his career in fashion photography, portraits, and commercial advertising and shifted in 2009 to Contemporary Art and Fine-art photography.

A researcher and photographer, Kat is best known for his explorations of culture and heritage as well as landscape and spiritual transformations.

In 2013, he introduced a new technique in contemporary Art classified as a post-medium condition, a type of "digital collage". He calls it "Mental Spaces", the artwork deals with capturing a given space and connects several images taken from various angles to create one image, offering the viewer a chance to experience a given space from multiple angles in one gaze. "This technique allows me to cover several dimensions of a space and to effectively sum up all the facts into a single visual. A sample of "Mental Spaces" by Emy Kat titled "Indoors" 2013

His work is included in a number of prominent private and public collections. His iconographic studies on the subject "Femme" describing her superiorities (Nude studies on Platinum) is a permanent collection at BNF Bibliothèque nationale de France [2000]. The collection is under Reference number Ep-4001-Boîte pet. fol.(Collection Publiques).  His work from the project "The Everlasting Now" has been acquired by the British Museum [2017].

Kat participated in a number of local and international shows including Jeddah Arts 21,39 inaugural exhibition Moallaqat [2014], Art Dubai [2014] and Paris Photo [2014].

Kat has lived and worked in Los Angeles, New York, London, Dubai and is currently based in Paris where his studio is located.

Film vs digital
Although Kat chose to work mostly with photographic film, he majored in digital imaging. The limits of digital photography are to blame for this. He began utilizing a top-of-the-line LEAF digital camera back system in 2008. However, for the most of his fine art, he still uses photographic film with a large format view camera and medium format camera.

Notable artwork

Nude studies of women on platinum (Etudes Nus femme) Archived and collected by the BNF Bibliothèque nationale de France (2000). Reference number Ep-4001-Boîte pet. fol.(Collection Publiques)
La Pass Murraille – series of 5 images – edition 3 – (1999)
Souls on the streets (Ames Dans les Rues) –  (2009) 
The Everlasting Now – (2012–2013) solo exhibition, Athr Gallery [2014] 21,39 Moallaqat Exhibition 1st edition [2013] Art Dubai [2014] Solo Exhibition, Bin Mattar House [2014] Paris Photo [2014] 1er Biennale des photographes du mond Arabe – Institute du Mond Arabe – Paris [2015]

Book contributions
Kat's photographs have been included in several books published by Graphis Inc.

(2007) "Photography Annual" 
(2006) "Photography Annual" 
(2000) "Nude 3" 
(1998) "Photography Annual" 
(1997) Annual Design

References

Living people
Contemporary artists
Portrait photographers
1959 births
Brooks Institute alumni